What's Love Got to Do with It? is a 2022 British romantic comedy film directed by Shekhar Kapur, from a screenplay by Jemima Khan. The film stars Lily James, Shazad Latif, Shabana Azmi, Emma Thompson, Sajal Aly, Oliver Chris, Asim Chaudhry, Jeff Mirza, Alice Orr-Ewing, and Rahat Fateh Ali Khan.

What's Love Got to Do with It had its world premiere at the Toronto International Film Festival on 10 September 2022, won Best Comedy (the ‘Ugo Tognazzi’ award) at the Rome Film Fest on 22 October 2022, and  released in the United Kingdom on 24 February 2023, by StudioCanal.

Premise
Set between London and Lahore, a filmmaker documents her childhood friend and neighbour's arranged marriage to a bride from Pakistan.

Cast
 Lily James as Zoe
 Shazad Latif as Kazim "Kaz" Khan 
 Shabana Azmi as Aisha Khan
 Emma Thompson as Cath
 Sajal Aly as Maymouna
 Oliver Chris as James
 Asim Chaudhry as Mo 
 Jeff Mirza as Zahid Khan
 Iman Boujelouah as Yasmin Khan
 Pakiza Baig as Nanijaan
 Alice Orr-Ewing as Helena
 Rahat Fateh Ali Khan as Qawwali Singer
 Naufal Azmir Khan as Zafar
 Sindhu Vee

Production
In November 2020, it was announced Lily James, Emma Thompson and Shazad Latif had joined the cast of the film, with Shekhar Kapur directing from a screenplay by Jemima Khan, who will also serve as a producer on the film, alongside Tim Bevan and Eric Fellner who will produce under their Working Title Films banner, with StudioCanal to distribute. In January 2021, Rob Brydon, Shabana Azmi, Sajal Aly and Asim Chaudhry joined the cast of the film; Brydon doesn’t appear in the final film.

Principal photography began in December 2020.

Reception

References

External links
 

British romantic comedy films
Working Title Films films
StudioCanal films
Films produced by Eric Fellner
Films produced by Tim Bevan
Films directed by Shekhar Kapur
2020s British films